Stingray City is a series of shallow sandbars found in the North Sound of Grand Cayman, Cayman Islands. It is a tourist attraction, where southern stingrays are found in abundance and visitors can pet and interact with the animals.

There are two sandbars, one which is in the shallows and the other one which is deeper and where it is possible to dive with stingrays.

Location 

Stingray City is in the shallow waters off the northwest corner of Grand Cayman's North Sound. It is just inside a natural channel that passes through the barrier reef and consists of a string of sandbars crossing the North Sound from Morgan Harbour to Rum Point.

History 
It may be that stingrays began gathering in the area decades ago when fisherman returning from an excursion, navigated behind a reef into the sound, and cleaned their fish in the calm water of the shallows and sandbar area. The fish guts and squid were thrown overboard and the stingrays eventually congregated to feast there. Soon the stingrays associated the sound of a boat engine with food. As this practice turned into a tradition, divers realized that the stingrays could be fed by hand.

Today, tour and excursion boats, along with private watercraft, gather at Stingray City in large numbers. There is a wide variety of companies that offer Stingray City excursions, which all have their own unique features.  Passengers disembark and enter the chest-high water to interact with the stingrays.  The boats' proprietors bring along with them pails of chunked-up squid meat, which they dispense by hand to the animals, thus attracting dozens of the creatures to the feeding spot. Visitors can visit Stingray City and pet stingrays, while standing in only 3 feet of water. There are however growing concerns about alterations in behaviour, feeding patterns and general ecology of these rays, when compared to rays not receiving supplemental nutrition.

References

External links
Official website
Stingray City Photo Gallery

 
Tourism in the Cayman Islands
Underwater diving sites in the Caribbean